The following page lists all power stations in Serbia.

Thermal

Coal 
The total generating capacity is 4,390 MW (excluding Kosovo A and Kosovo B power plants). With the establishment of the UNMIK administration in Kosovo on 1 July 1999, Serbia lost access to the local coal mines and power plants, including Kosovo A and Kosovo B power plants.

Natural gas 
The total generating capacity is 336 MW.

Hydro power plants 
The total generating capacity is 2,936 MW.

Wind power plants 

The total installed capacity is 500 MW.

See also
 List of power stations in Europe
 List of largest power stations in the world

References

External links

Serbia
 
Lists of buildings and structures in Serbia